Olusegun Oluwatimi (born August 5, 1999) is an American football center for the Michigan Wolverines. He previously attended the University of Virginia, playing college football for the Virginia Cavaliers before graduating with a degree in economics in 2021. Oluwatimi played a final year as a graduate student for the Wolverines at the University of Michigan in 2022, where he won the Rimington and Outland Trophy.

College
Oluwatimi attended DeMatha Catholic High School in Hyattsville, Maryland, before enrolling at the United States Air Force Academy in 2017. He was a member of the Air Force Falcons football team but did not appear in any games with them.

Virginia Cavaliers
Oluwatimi transferred to the University of Virginia in 2018 and started 32 consecutive games for the Virginia Cavaliers from 2019 to 2021. In 2021, he was one of the three finalists for the Rimington Trophy, an award presented annually to the best center in the country. He was selected by the Football Writers Association of America as a second-team All-American. Oluwatimi graduated with a degree in economics in 2021.

Michigan Wolverines
In January 2022, he transferred as a graduate student to play for the Michigan Wolverines at the University of Michigan.

By the end of the season, Oluwatimi retrieved the Outland Trophy as the best interior offensive lineman in college football and the Rimington Trophy as the best center. He was also named a consensus first-team All-American.

References

External links
 
 Michigan Wolverines bio
 Virginia Cavaliers bio

2002 births
Living people
All-American college football players
American football centers
DeMatha Catholic High School alumni
Michigan Wolverines football players
People from Hyattsville, Maryland
Players of American football from Maryland
United States Air Force Academy alumni
Virginia Cavaliers football players